The FLC-"Fluid Link Converter"- ATX was a 3-speed hydraulic automatic transaxle produced by Ford Motor Company from 1981 through 1994, first appearing in the North American Ford Escort, then later the European Escort in 1983.  It was Ford's first automatic transmission developed for front wheel drive and transverse engine location.  Used in the company's four-cylinder-powered cars ranging from the Escort to the Taurus. The 3.0 powered Tempo/Topaz used a beefed up version of the FLC as well. The transaxle did not have a lockup torque converter, or overdrive. It was controlled by a throttle or "kickdown" Linkage, the speedometer drive used a mechanical cable, and had no computer controls.

With the four-cylinder Taurus excised from the lineup after 1991, and with the addition of the new computer-controlled, 4-speed F-4EAT from Mazda, for the Ford Escort/Mercury Tracer, the original FLC continued in production solely for the Tempo and Topaz until those cars were discontinued in 1994.

Applications:
 1981-1987 Mercury Lynx
 1981-1990 Ford Escort (North America)
 1983-1990 Ford Escort (Europe) / Ford Orion
 1982-1988 Ford EXP
 1982-1983 Mercury LN7
 1984-1994 Ford Tempo
 1984-1994 Mercury Topaz
 1986-1991 Ford Taurus
 1990-1994 Ford Laser
 ?-1993 Ford Falcon

See also
 List of Ford transmissions

ATX/FLC